Déjà Fou is the 16th studio album by English band Strawbs. The title is a play on the phrase déjà vu, French for "already seen", as the band line-up had been seen 30 years before on the Hero and Heroine album. The phrase déjà fou literally means "already mad". The album delivers the kind of British folk rock the band had built its reputation on.

Track listing

"Riviera dei Fiori" (Dave Cousins, Dave Lambert) – 1:43
"Under a Cloudless Sky" (Cousins) – 5:16
"Face Down in the Well" (Cousins) – 5:55
"On a Night Like This" (Cousins) – 2:27
"If" (Cousins) – 5:07
"Cold Steel" (Lambert)) – 5:07
"Sunday Morning" (Cousins, Lambert) – 3:24
"This Barren Land" (Cousins, Lambert) – 4:47
"When the Lights Came On" (Lambert) – 5:43
"Russian Front" (Cousins, Chas Cronk, John Hawken, Lambert) – 5:40
"Here Today, Gone Tomorrow" (Cousins) – 4:14
"NRG" (Cousins) – 4:09

Personnel
Strawbs
Dave Cousins – lead vocals, backing vocals, guitar, banjo, mandolin, chromaharp
Dave Lambert – lead vocals, backing vocals, guitar
Chas Cronk – backing vocals, bass guitar, guitar
John Hawken – keyboards
Rod Coombes – drums, percussion

Additional personnel
Chris While – vocals
Julie Matthews – vocals
Adam Wakeman - piano
Robert Kirby – French horn, string arrangements
Michael Humphrey – violin
Paul Robson – violin
Jonathan Welch – viola
Rebecca Gilliver – cello
Nick Worters – double bass

Recording

Recorded at KD's Studio, Chiswick, London
Dave Cousins – producer
Kenny Denton, Chas Cronk – engineers
Roger Wake – mastering

Release history

References

External links
Déjà Fou on Strawbsweb

Strawbs albums
2004 albums
Albums arranged by Robert Kirby